John Alexander Luetkemeyer, Sr. (February 12, 1910 – September 17, 1998) was Treasurer of Maryland.

Luetkemeyer was born in Cleveland, the son of Gustave Luetkemeyer and Julie (née Lueke). His four grandparents were born in Germany.

In 1942, he was in the Marines as a bomb disposal expert, receiving the Purple Heart twice and the Bronze Star for gallantry.

In 1961, Luetkemeyer was appointed to the banking board by J. Millard Tawes while serving as president of the Equitable Bank and Trust Company. The position determined which banks received deposits from the state and would be considered a conflict of interest under current regulations today.

He was the grandfather of actress Julie Bowen (born Julie Luetkemeyer).

References 

1910 births
1988 deaths
State treasurers of Maryland
Maryland Democrats
Harvard University alumni
American people of German descent
People from Cleveland